The 1978 CFL Draft composed of eight rounds where 90 Canadian football players were chosen from eligible Canadian universities and Canadian players playing in the NCAA. A total of 18 players were selected as territorial exemptions, with the Toronto Argonauts being the only team to make no picks during this stage of the draft.

Territorial exemptions

Calgary Stampeders                                 Miles Gorrell  DT  Ottawa

Calgary Stampeders                                     Robert Lubig  G  Montana State

Hamilton Tiger-Cats                                Rocky DiPietro          TB                  Ottawa

Hamilton Tiger-Cats                                    Bruce Holland  DT  Wilfrid Laurier

Hamilton Tiger-Cats                                    Ted Kogler  LB  Waterloo

Saskatchewan Roughriders                           Rodney Besler  T  Utah

Saskatchewan Roughriders                               Doug Redl  G  Saskatchewan

Winnipeg Blue Bombers                              Leo Ezerins  TE  Whitworth

Winnipeg Blue Bombers                                  Bernie Morrison  LB  Manitoba

Winnipeg Blue Bombers  Tim Allan  G  Toronto

British Columbia Lions  John Blake  G  San Jose State

British Columbia Lions                                 Phil Luke  DE  Simon Fraser

Ottawa Rough Riders                                Dick Bakker  T  Queen's

Ottawa Rough Riders  Bruce Walker  WR  Windsor

Edmonton Eskimos                                   Joe Poplawski  WR  Alberta

Edmonton Eskimos                                       Dave Willox           DE                Alberta

Montreal Alouettes                                 Rene Deschamps  DT  Calgary

Montreal Alouettes                                     Craig Labbett  TE  Western Ontario

1st round
1. Calgary Stampeders                                  Dave Kirzinger        DT                Ottawa

2. Hamilton Tiger-Cats                                 Bob O'Doherty         WR                Queen's

3. British Columbia Lions                              Rick Goltz            DT                Simon Fraser

4. Winnipeg Blue Bombers  Evan Jones  TE  British Columbia

5. Toronto Argonauts  Mark Brown  TB  Guelph

6. Montreal Alouettes                                  Neil Quilter          OT                British Columbia

7. Ottawa Rough Riders  Dan Taylor  TB  Iowa Central

8. Edmonton Eskimos                                    Rick Dundas           LB                Whitworth

9. Montreal Alouettes  Phil Noble            LB                Western Ontario

2nd round
10. Calgary Stampeders                                 Rob Kochel            DB                Western Ontario

11. Hamilton Tiger-Cats                                Larry Colbey          T                 Simon Fraser

12. Montreal Alouettes                                 Gary Boechler        G                 Saskatchewan

13. Winnipeg Blue Bombers                              Bob Stracina  WR  Acadia

14. Montreal Alouettes                                 Jerry Friesen         LB                Saskatchewan

15. British Columbia Lions  Tom Schultz           LB                Simon Fraser

16. Montreal Alouettes                                 Bob Hultgren  WR  McMaster

17. Edmonton Eskimos                                   Rick Bellamy          G                 Wilfrid Laurier

18. Montreal Alouettes                                 Ty Morris  WR  Puget Sound

3rd round
19. Calgary Stampeders  Dave Allen  DE  Bishop's

20. Hamilton Tiger-Cats                                Angelo Castallan      DT                 Toronto

21. Saskatchewan Roughriders                           Les McFarlane         DB                 Saskatchewan

22. Winnipeg Blue Bombers                              Vaughn Wright         TB                 Guelph

23. Toronto Argonauts                                  Jerry Gulyes          K                  Wilfrid Laurier

24. Edmonton Eskimos                                   Gerry Palmer  DB  Carleton

25. Montreal Alouettes                                 Bill O'Bryan  C  Oregon State

26. Edmonton Eskimos  Paul Watson  K  Washington State

27. Calgary Stampeders                                 Gary Tom              WR                  McMaster

4th round
28. Calgary Stampeders                                 Mike Karpow           K                   Waterloo

29. Hamilton Tiger-Cats                                Dave Stumpf           T                   Toronto

30. Saskatchewan Roughriders                           Maurice Butler        WR                  Simon Fraser

31. Winnipeg Blue Bombers                              Julian Hanlon         G                   Ottawa

32. Toronto Argonauts                                  John Greenough        DT                  McMaster

33. British Columbia Lions  Phil Roberts  LB  McGill

34. Ottawa Rough Riders                                Phil Battaglia  LB  New Brunswick

35. Edmonton Eskimos                                   Jim Hole              G                   Alberta

36. Montreal Alouettes                                 Sandy Gray            DB                  Ottawa

5th round
37. Calgary Stampeders                                 Mark Moors            G                   Acadia

38. Hamilton Tiger-Cats                                Bill Levine           DT                  Toronto

39. Saskatchewan Roughriders                           Mike Hume  TB  Concordia

40. Winnipeg Blue Bombers                              Dave Neber            DE                  British Columbia

41. Toronto Argonauts  Tim Jones             WR                  Simon Fraser

42. British Columbia Lions                             Barry Dobson          TE                  McGill

43. Ottawa Rough Riders                                Lindon Davidson       T                   Ottawa

44. Edmonton Eskimos                                   Richard Foggo         DB                  Calgary

45. Montreal Alouettes                                 Kerry Powell          HB                  Queen's

6th round
46. Calgary Stampeders                                 Bob Dear              G                   Calgary

47. Hamilton Tiger-Cats                                Yves Leclerc          QB                  Ottawa

48. Saskatchewan Roughriders                           Mike Lamborn          DB                  Saskatchewan

49. Winnipeg Blue Bombers  Steve Davis           DT                  Bishop's

50. Toronto Argonauts  Tim Jones             C                   Simon Fraser

51. British Columbia Lions                             John Tietzen          WR                  Alberta

52. Ottawa Rough Riders                                Dave Yurincich        DT                  Wilfrid Laurier

53. Edmonton Eskimos                                   Mark Coflin           G                   Alberta

54. Montreal Alouettes                                 Henry Svec            DT                  Western Ontario

7th round
55. Calgary Stampeders                                 Jim Mossop            DB                  Toronto

56. Hamilton Tiger-Cats                                Mike Katarincic       DB                  Wilfrid Laurier

57. Saskatchewan Roughriders  Daniel Graham         LB                  McGill

58. Winnipeg Blue Bombers                              Gord Bone             TE                  Manitoba

59. Toronto Argonauts                                  Clark Johnson         WR                  Concordia

60. British Columbia Lions                             Bill Hole             DT                  Alberta

61. Ottawa Rough Riders                                Tom Barbeau           TB                  McGill

62. Edmonton Eskimos                                   Dave Zacharko         LB                  Alberta

63. Montreal Alouettes  Clarence Coleman      TB                  Ottawa

8th round
64. Calgary Stampeders                                 Cam Prange            C                   Waterloo

65. Hamilton Tiger-Cats                                Dan Medwin           TE                   Ottawa

66. Saskatchewan Roughriders                           Tim Molnar           TB                   Saskatchewan

67. Winnipeg Blue Bombers                              Duane Hysop          QB                   Manitoba

68. Toronto Argonauts                                  Stan Strecker        DB                   Guelph

69. British Columbia Lions                             Don Guy              DB                   Alberta

70. Ottawa Rough Riders                                Mike Lyriotokis  DT  Prince Edward Island

71. Edmonton Eskimos                                   Wes McHarg           DB                    Alberta

72. Montreal Alouettes                                 Eris Salvatori       TB                    McGill

References
Canadian Draft

Canadian College Draft
Cfl Draft, 1978